Susana Gaspar (born 1981)  is a Portuguese operatic soprano.

Gaspar studied at the Lisbon Music Conservatory, the Guildhall School of Music and Drama, where she graduated with a MMus degree, and at the National Opera Studio.

In 2011, Gaspar made her debut with The Royal Opera as Barbarina in Le nozze di Figaro.

Operatic repertoire
 Papagena in Die Zauberflöte 
 Giannetta in L'elisir d'amore 
 Voice from Heaven in Don Carlo 
 Barbarina in Le nozze di Figaro
 Mimi in La bohème

References

Living people
Portuguese sopranos
1981 births
21st-century Portuguese women opera singers